Parliamentary elections were held in Hungary between 5 and 14 August 1878. The result was a victory for the Liberal Party, which won 239 of the 413 seats.

Results

Elections in Hungary
Hungary
Election
Elections in Austria-Hungary

hu:Magyarországi országgyűlési választások a dualizmus korában#1878